Bardkashki (also Romanized as Bardkashkī; also known as Barkashkī and Barkashkī-ye Pā’īn) is a village in Tayebi-ye Garmsiri-ye Jonubi Rural District, in the Central District of Kohgiluyeh County, Kohgiluyeh and Boyer-Ahmad Province, Iran. At the 2006 census, its population was 75, in 16 families.

References 

Populated places in Kohgiluyeh County